In enzymology, a NADPH peroxidase is an enzyme that catalyzes the chemical reaction

NADPH + H+ + H2O2  NADP+ + 2 H2O

The 3 substrates of this enzyme are NADPH, H+, and H2O2, whereas its two products are NADP+ and H2O.

This enzyme belongs to the family of oxidoreductases, specifically those acting on a peroxide as acceptor (peroxidases).  The systematic name of this enzyme class is NADPH:hydrogen-peroxide oxidoreductase. Other names in common use include TPNH peroxidase, NADP peroxidase, nicotinamide adenine dinucleotide phosphate peroxidase, TPN peroxidase, triphosphopyridine nucleotide peroxidase, and NADPH2 peroxidase.

References

 

EC 1.11.1
NADPH-dependent enzymes
Enzymes of unknown structure